Antonio Beltrando or Antonio Trombetta (died 5 May 1476) was a Roman Catholic prelate who served as Bishop of Reggio Emilia (1466–1476).

Biography
On 28 May 1466, Antonio Beltrando was appointed during the papacy of Pope Paul II as Bishop of Reggio Emilia.
He served as Bishop of Reggio Emilia until his death on 5 May 1476. While bishop, he served as the principal co-consecrator of Pietro Mattei, Bishop of Sant'Agata de' Goti (1469).

References

External links and additional sources
 (for Chronology of Bishops) 
 (for Chronology of Bishops) 

15th-century Italian Roman Catholic bishops
Bishops appointed by Pope Paul II
1476 deaths